Hamiltonian fluid mechanics is the application of Hamiltonian methods to fluid mechanics. Note that this formalism only applies to nondissipative fluids.

Irrotational barotropic flow
Take the simple example of a barotropic, inviscid vorticity-free fluid.

Then, the conjugate fields are the mass density field ρ and the velocity potential φ. The Poisson bracket is given by

and the Hamiltonian by:

where e is the internal energy density, as a function of ρ. 
For this barotropic flow, the internal energy is related to the pressure p by:

where an apostrophe ('), denotes differentiation with respect to ρ.

This Hamiltonian structure gives rise to the following two equations of motion:

where  is the velocity and is vorticity-free. The second equation leads to the Euler equations:

after exploiting the fact that the vorticity is zero:

As fluid dynamics is described by non-canonical dynamics, which possess an infinite amount of Casimir invariants, an alternative formulation of Hamiltonian formulation of fluid dynamics can be introduced through the use of Nambu mechanics

See also
Luke's variational principle
Hamiltonian field theory

Notes

References

Fluid dynamics
Hamiltonian mechanics
Dynamical systems